James Dunbar may refer to:

 James Dunbar (writer) (1742–1798), philosophical writer
 James W. Dunbar (1860–1943), US representative
 Jim Dunbar (1929–2019), radio programme director
 James Dunbar (rower) (1930–2018), American rower and Olympic gold medallist
Sir James Dunbar, 1st Baronet (died 1718), of the Dunbar baronets, MP for Caithness
Sir James Dunbar, 3rd Baronet (died 1782), of the Dunbar baronets
Sir James George Hawker Roland Dunbar, 10th Baronet, (1862–1953) of the Dunbar baronets
Sir James Michael Dunbar, 14th Baronet (born 1950), of the Dunbar baronets

See also
James Dunbar-Nasmith, English conservation architect
Dunbar (surname)